The Women's 10,000m event at the 2010 South American Games was held on March 20 at 17:15.  The competition was not part of the South American Games, because the minimum number of 4 participating nations was not reached, but counted only for the South American Under-23 Championships.

Medalists

Records

Results
Results were published.

†: Karina Villazana from  Perú was initially 1st in 36:48.53, but was disqualified, because being tested positive for cocaine abuse.

Intermediate times:

See also
2010 South American Under-23 Championships in Athletics

References

External links
Report

10000 W